is the 2007 winner of the Miss Nippon contest selected out of 3000 girls held by a diet gym company. The 2007 was her 3rd challenge. She graduated from Mie University in Mie Prefecture. She moved to Tokyo to graduate the graduate school at Rikkyo University in Tokyo. She is currently working as a TV actress living in Tokyo, mainly working for a MieTV local sightseeing program.

External links 
 Official blog

References

1983 births
Living people
Rikkyo University alumni
People from Mie Prefecture